Agyina is a community in the Kintampo South District of the Bono East Region of Ghana. It has a high immigrant population from Northern Ghana and is noted for its large scale farming activities. Languages spoken in this community are mainly Asante twi and Dagbanli.

References 

Populated places in the Bono East Region